Marco Armiliato (born 1967) is an Italian opera conductor.

Born in Genoa, Italy, he graduated in piano from the Niccolò Paganini Conservatory in Genoa. After working for a few years as a piano master in several opera houses, he debuted as a conductor in 1989 in Lima, with Gaetano Donizetti's opera L'elisir d'amore. He has since conducted in numerous opera houses around the world, including the Bayerische Staatsoper, Deutsche Oper Berlin, the Royal Opera House Covent Garden, Opéra National de Paris, Opernhaus Zürich, Teatro Real de Madrid, Gran Teatre del Liceu in Barcelona, Teatro Regio in Turin, Teatro dell'Opera in Rome, and Arena in Verona. He has over 80 operas in his repertoire.

At the Metropolitan Opera in New York he has conducted over 450 performances, second only to former music director James Levine in the 21st century. He has conducted works by Giuseppe Verdi (Il Trovatore, Aida, Rigoletto, Macbeth, and Stiffelio), Giacomo Puccini (La Bohème, Madama Butterfly, and Turandot), Donizetti, and others since his debut in 1998.

At the San Francisco Opera he directed La Bohème, Madama Butterfly, Turandot, La Traviata, Tosca, Aida, La Favorita, Il Trovatore and Cavalleria Rusticana.

At Wiener Staatsoper he directed the operas Tosca, Fedora, Il barbiere di Siviglia, La Favorita, Jérusalem, Turandot, Andrea Chénier, Cavalleria Rusticana, I Pagliacci, Stiffelio, La Traviata, Manon Lescaut, and Carmen.

He conducted the Orchestra Sinfonica Di Milano Giuseppe Verdi accompanying Renée Fleming on her album, Verismo Arias, which won the Grammy Award for Best Classical Vocal Performance at the 52nd Annual Grammy Awards for 2009.

He is the younger brother of the tenor Fabio Armiliato.

References 

Italian conductors (music)
Musicians from Genoa
1967 births
Living people